James Caufield and Frank W. Shook were American photographers who founded an eponymous photography studio in Louisville, Kentucky in 1903. Their firm focused on local Louisville scenes. It became the official photographer of the Kentucky Derby in 1924. The business was sold in 1960 and ceased operation in 1978.

A catalog of the firm's works titled the Caufield & Shook Collection, consisting of more than one million negatives and 2,000 vintage prints, is housed at the University of Louisville Photographic Archives.

External links
 Caufield & Shook Collection at the University of Louisville Libraries

Photography companies of the United States
Commercial photographers
Photography in the United States
American companies established in 1903
Design companies established in 1903
Design companies disestablished in 1978
Defunct companies based in Louisville, Kentucky
1903 establishments in Kentucky
1978 disestablishments in Kentucky
1960 mergers and acquisitions
American companies disestablished in 1978